Geraldine Stutz (August 5, 1924 – April 8, 2005) was an American retail groundbreaker. She was appointed president of Henri Bendel in 1957, serving for 29 years until stepping down in 1986.

Biography

She was born in Chicago, Illinois. Her parents were Anthony H. and Estelle Tully Stutz. She had a younger sister.
Stutz married British painter David Gibbs. They divorced in 1977.

At first, she aspired to be an actress. She studied drama at Mundelein College before changing her mind: Although still attached to a theater-related career, she began an interest in journalism. She moved to New York and became a fashion editor for movie magazines. In 1947, she was recruited as an associate fashion editor for Glamour magazine, where she wrote about shoes.

Her name first became really known when she was Vice President of I. Miller Shoes in the 1950s where she helped launch Andy Warhol. From there she was selected to head an ailing Henri Bendel and was given three years to make it profitable. By 1964, Henry Bendel had experienced a 10 percent increase in sales, the largest increase in its history. By 1967, it had doubled its sale. In 1967, with financing from an international consortium, Stutz purchased Bendel from Genesco for 8 million dollars, becoming its managing partner and 30 percent owner.

Stutz was named one of the best dressed women in the Fashion Industry in 1959, 1963, 1964. In 1965, she was elected to the Fashion Industry Hall of Fame.

She retired to and died in her home on the Upper East Side of Manhattan.

Stutz was once asked: "What is the difference between mere fashion and true style?" Her answer was: "Fashion says 'Me too', and style says 'Only me'." She thought her best talent was as a finder and nourisher of talents, "I help people to perform more bravely than they think they can."

The New York Times describes her as having "transformed Henri Bendel from a carriage trade retailer in decline into a chic emporium of designer brands in the 1960s." and facilitated the rise of Stephen Burrows, Perry Ellis, Jean Muir, Sonia Rykiel, Carlos Falchi, Mary McFadden, Holly Harp and Ralph Lauren among others.

References

1924 births
2005 deaths
American businesspeople in retailing
American women in business
20th-century American women
20th-century American people
21st-century American women